Teams made up of athletes representing different National Olympic Committees (NOCs), called mixed-NOCs teams, participated in the 2018 Summer Youth Olympics. These teams participated in either events composed entirely of mixed-NOCs teams, or in events which saw the participation of mixed-NOCs teams and non-mixed-NOCs teams. When a mixed-NOCs team won a medal, the Olympic flag was raised rather than a national flag; if a mixed-NOCs team won gold, the Olympic anthem would be played instead of national anthems. A total of 18 events with Mixed NOCs were held.

Background 
The concept of mixed-NOCs was introduced in the 2010 Summer Youth Olympics, in which athletes from different nations would compete in the same team, often representing their continent. This is in contrast to the Mixed team (IOC code: ZZX) found at early senior Olympic Games.

Archery

Badminton

Cycling

Cycling featured a mixed team competition with one mixed-NOC entry, but medals were won by individual NOCs.

Dancesport

Diving

Equestrian

Fencing

Golf

Golf featured mixed team competition with one mixed-NOC entry, but medals were won by individual NOCs.

Gymnastics

Judo

Modern pentathlon

Shooting

Table tennis

Table tennis featured mixed team competition, but medals were won by individual NOCs.

Tennis

Triathlon

See also
 2018 Summer Youth Olympics medal table
 Mixed-NOCs at the Youth Olympics

References

2018 Summer Youth Olympics
Mixed teams at the Youth Olympics